Star Movies is an Indian regional-language pay movie channel owned by The Walt Disney Company India. a wholly owned by The Walt Disney Company. this is the Indian version of Star Movies. It' primary focus is Hollywood films.

History 
Star Movies was launched  by  Star TV. It was bought by News Corporation who formed Star India to operate the channel.

In March 2019, The Walt Disney Company acquired 21st Century Fox for $71 million.

The channel ceased broadcasting in Sri Lanka from 1 February 2015 due to content rights issues, leaving the country with no Star Movies or Fox Movies channel.

The channel was relaunched in Sri Lanka in 2019.

Programming 
Star Movies has had an exclusive content deal with 20th Century Studios and Walt Disney Studios since 2006. Star Movies also shows movies from other studios.

Star Movies India HD
Star Movies India launched their HD feed on 15 October 2013.

Channels

Defunct channels

References 

The Walt Disney Company subsidiaries
Movie channels in India
Television channels and stations established in 1992
English-language television stations in India
Disney Star

pt: Star Movies (Índia)